"Love Makes the World Go 'Round" is a popular music song written by Ollie Jones. The most popular version was recorded by Perry Como in 1958. He made two recordings that year, one on September 5 and one on September 16. The 45rpm single based on one of these was released by RCA Victor Records as catalog numbers 47-7353 (mono) and 61-7353 (stereo). It peaked at number 33 on the Billboard chart.

A United Kingdom release was made by RCA (78rpm, catalog number 1086), which reached number 6 on the UK Singles Chart and number 5 on the Belgium chart. A Japanese release in stereo was made by RCA (catalog number SX-1002). All of these were backed by "Mandolins in the Moonlight" on the flip side.

British rockabilly trio, The Jets, reached number 21 in 1982 in the UK chart with their cover version.

References

External links
Song lyric

1958 songs
1958 singles
1982 singles
Songs written by Ollie Jones (songwriter)
Perry Como songs